The imperial boomerang or Foucault's boomerang is the thesis that governments that develop repressive techniques to control colonial territories will eventually deploy those same techniques domestically against their own citizens.

Origin 

The concept was advanced by Hannah Arendt in The Origins of Totalitarianism and Aimé Césaire in Discourse on Colonialism, in both cases to explain the origins of European fascism in the first half of the 20th century.  According to both writers, the methods of Adolf Hitler and the Nazi Party were not exceptional from a world-wide view, because European colonial powers had been killing millions of people worldwide as part of the process of colonization for a very long time. Rather, they were exceptional in that they were applied to Europeans within Europe, rather than to colonized populations in the global south.

In her book, The Origins of Totalitarianism, Hannah Arendt considers the Soviet and Nazi regimes alongside European colonies in Africa and Asia, as their later and gruesome transformation. She analyzes Russian pan-Slavism as a stage in the development of racism and totalitarianism. Her analysis was continued by Alexander Etkind in the book "Internal colonization: Russia's imperial experience".

Association with Foucault 

In his 1976 lecture Society Must Be Defended, Michel Foucault expanded on these ideas. According to him: [W]hile colonization, with its techniques and its political and juridical weapons, obviously transported European models to other continents, it also had a considerable boomerang effect on the mechanisms of power in the West, and on the apparatuses, institutions, and techniques of power. A whole series of colonial models was brought back to the West, and the result was that the West could practice something resembling colonization, or an internal colonialism, on itself

Usage 

Foucault's boomerang has been invoked to explain the ongoing militarization of police and their domestic deployment in response to political protest in urban centers. Such deployment has also proliferated worldwide, considering that the globalization of militarized policing continues to be a crucial aspect of contemporary foreign policy of Western colonial powers such as the United States, whose early experiments with developing comprehensive coercive state apparatuses and counterinsurgency techniques began during the US colonization of the Philippines.

See also 
 Imperialism
 Postcolonialism

References 

Sociological theories
Political science
Sociological terminology
Postcolonialism